Phokion may refer to:
 Phocion (c. 402 – c. 318 BC), an Athenian statesman and strategos
 Phokion J. Tanos (1898 – 1972), a Cypriot dealer of antiques in Cairo